Dukeville is an unincorporated community in Knox County, Nebraska, United States.

History
A post office was established at Dukeville in 1875, and remained in operation until it was discontinued in 1911.

Geography

References

Unincorporated communities in Knox County, Nebraska
Unincorporated communities in Nebraska